The  Apollo Theater is a music hall at 253 West 125th Street between Adam Clayton Powell Jr. Boulevard (Seventh Avenue) and Frederick Douglass Boulevard (Eighth Avenue) in the Harlem neighborhood of Upper Manhattan in New York City.  It is a noted venue for African-American performers, and is the home of Showtime at the Apollo, a nationally syndicated television variety show that showcased new talent, from 1987 to 2008, encompassing 1,093 episodes; the show was rebooted in 2018.

The theater, which has a capacity of 1,506, opened in 1913 as Hurtig & Seamon's Music Hall. It was designed by George Keister in the neo-Classical style. Alterations were made that year for showing movies, and it was renamed the Apollo Theater. (It was often referred to as the "125th Street Apollo" to distinguish it from the legitimate Apollo on 42nd Street). In 1924, the Minsky brothers leased the theater for burlesque shows. In 1934, it became a venue for black performers and was opened to black patrons for the first time.  In 1983, both the interior and exterior of the building were designated as New York City Landmarks, and the building was added to the National Register of Historic Places. It is estimated that 1.3 million people visit the Apollo every year.

History

Creation and rise

The building that later became the Apollo Theater was built in 1913 and was designed by architect George Keister. It was originally Hurtig and Seamon's New (Burlesque) Theater, which enforced a strict "Whites Only" policy. The theater was operated by noted burlesque producers Jules Hurtig and Harry Seamon. 

 They made alterations to the theater that same year and renamed it the Apollo.

In 1924, the Minskys took a long-term lease for burlesque shows, some of which included integrated casts with black performers such as Pigmeat Markham. After New York City mayor Fiorello La Guardia cracked down on burlesque, the theater was purchased in 1933 by Sidney Cohen, who owned other theaters in the area. Lavish renovations were made and it re-opened on January 26, 1934, catering to the black community of Harlem. On February 14, 1934, the first major star to appear at the Apollo was jazz singer and Broadway star Adelaide Hall in Clarence Robinson's production Chocolate Soldiers, which featured Sam Wooding's Orchestra. The show ran for a limited engagement and was highly praised by the press, which helped establish the Apollo's reputation.

Managed by Morris Sussman, Cohen's Apollo theater had vigorous competition from other venues, such as the Lafayette, managed by Frank Schiffman, which presented acts such as Louis Armstrong, Bill "Bojangles" Robinson and Bessie Smith and Eddie Green.  Leo Brecher's Harlem Opera House was another competing venue.  To improve the shows at the Apollo, Cohen hired noted talent scout John Hammond to book his shows. However, the deal fell through when Cohen died, and the result was the merger of the Apollo with the Harlem Opera House.  The Opera House became a movie theater, but the Apollo, under the ownership of Brecher and Schiffman, continued to present stage shows. Schiffman hired Clarence Robinson as in-house producer.

Originally, a typical show presented at the Apollo was akin to a vaudeville show, including a chorus line of beautiful girls.  As the years progressed, such variety shows were presented less often.

Decline and restoration 
Although the 1960s was the venue's most successful decade, in the following decade, the drug problem in Harlem, with its attendant robberies and thefts, was the cause of its closing in 1976, after an 18-year-old was shot to death. On April 1 and 2, 1976, Fred and Felicidad Dukes along with Rafee Kamaal produced two 60-minute television specials with Group W Productions as a way to help restore life to the theater, which re-opened in that year, featuring acts such as Ashford and Simpson, Labelle, Cab Calloway, and Stephanie Mills, etc. From 1975 to 1982, the theater was owned by Guy Fisher. In 1983, it was bought by Inner City Broadcasting, a firm owned by former Manhattan borough president Percy E. Sutton. It obtained federal and city landmark status in that same year. In 1991, the Apollo was purchased by the State of New York, which created the non-profit Apollo Theater Foundation to run it.

In 2001, the architecture firms Beyer Blinder Belle, which specializes in restorations of historic buildings, and Davis Brody Bond began a restoration of the theater's interior. In 2005, restoration of the exterior, and the installation of a new light-emitting diode (LED) marquee began. In 2009–10, in celebration of the theater's 75th anniversary, the theater put together an archive of historical material, including documents and photographs and, with Columbia University, began an oral history project. , the Apollo Theater draws an estimated 1.3 million visitors annually.

Amateur Night at the Apollo 

Schiffman had first introduced an amateur night at the Lafayette Theater, where it was known as "Harlem Amateur Hour", and was hosted by Ralph Cooper. At the Apollo, it was originally called "Audition Night", but later became "Amateur Night in Harlem", held every Wednesday evening and broadcast on the radio over WMCA and eleven affiliate stations.

One unique feature of the Apollo during Amateur Nights was "the executioner", a man with a broom who would sweep performers off the stage if the highly vocal and opinionated audiences began to call for their removal. Vaudeville tap dancer "Sandman" Sims played the role from the 1950s to 2000; stagehand Norman Miller, known as "Porto Rico" (later played by Bob Collins) might also chase the unfortunate performer offstage with a cap pistol, accompanied by the sound of a siren.

The Apollo grew to prominence during the Harlem Renaissance of the pre-World War II years. Billing itself as a place "where stars are born and legends are made," the Apollo became famous for launching the careers of artists such as Ella Fitzgerald, who made her singing debut at 17 at the Apollo, on November 21, 1934. Fitzgerald's performances pulled in a weekly audience at the Apollo and she won the opportunity to compete in one of the earliest of its "Amateur Nights".  She had originally intended to go on stage and dance, but intimidated by the Edwards Sisters, a local dance duo, she opted to sing instead, in the style of Connee Boswell.  She sang Hoagy Carmichael's "Judy" and "The Object of My Affection", a song recorded by the Boswell Sisters, and won the first prize of $25.00.

Vocalist Thelma Carpenter won the amateur night in 1938, returning several times later as a headliner and also for the 1993 NBC-TV special "Apollo Theater Hall of Fame", an all-star tribute hosted by Bill Cosby. Before becoming famous, Luther Vandross appeared on five occasions-and was booed off stage every time.

Jimi Hendrix won the first place prize in an amateur musician contest at the Apollo in 1964. Amateur Night had its first tie on October 27, 2010, with guitarist Nathan Foley, 16, of Rockville, Maryland, and cellist and singer Ayanna Witter-Johnson, 25, a student at the Manhattan School of Music from London, sharing the $10,000 prize.

Notable shows and performers 
During the swing era, along with bands such as Duke Ellington, Dizzy Gillespie, Chick Webb, Count Basie, and Andy Kirk, the Apollo also presented dance acts such as Bill Robinson, the Nicholas Brothers, Carmen De Lavallade and Geoffrey Holder, the Berry Brothers, and Buck and Bubbles. Comic acts also appeared on the Apollo stage, such as Butterbeans and Susie, including some who performed in blackface, much to the horror of the NAACP and the elite of Harlem.

The Apollo also featured the performances of old-time vaudeville favorites like Tim Moore, Stepin Fetchit, Moms Mabley, Dewey "Pigmeat" Markham, Clinton "Dusty" Fletcher, John "Spider Bruce" Mason, and Johnny Lee, as well as younger comics like Bill Cosby, Godfrey Cambridge, LaWanda Page, Richard Pryor, Rudy Ray Moore, and Redd Foxx.

Gospel acts which played the Apollo include the Staple Singers, Mahalia Jackson, The Clark Sisters, Sister Rosetta Tharpe, Clara Ward and Sam Cooke with the Soul Stirrers.  Performers of soul music on the Apollo stage included Ray Charles, Otis Redding and Aretha Franklin, and jazz was represented as well, by acts such as Art Blakey and Horace Silver.

Although the theater concentrated on showcasing African-American acts, it also presented white acts such as swing bandleaders Harry James, Woody Herman and Charlie Barnet during the swing era, and, later, jazz greats Dave Brubeck, Stan Getz and Buddy Rich, who was a particular favorite of the Apollo crowd. During the 1950s, several white rock and roll performers whose musical backgrounds were more country music oriented, such as Buddy Holly and Duane Eddy played the Apollo but scored with their audiences by playing blues-styled material. The theater's audience was often mixed: in the 1940s it was estimated that during the week about 40% of the audience was white, which would go up to 75% for weekend shows. Jazz singer Anita O'Day headlined for the week of September 21, 1950, billed as "the Jezebel of Jazz".

Other performers whose careers started at the Apollo include Billie Holiday, Pearl Bailey (actress), Sammy Davis Jr., James Brown & The Famous Flames, King Curtis, Diana Ross & The Supremes, Parliament-Funkadelic, Wilson Pickett, The Miracles, Gladys Knight & the Pips, Stephanie Mills, Dionne Warwick, The Jackson 5, Patti Austin, Patti LaBelle, Marvin Gaye, Luther Vandross, Stevie Wonder, Aretha Franklin, Ben E. King, The Isley Brothers,Fat Joe, Lauryn Hill, Sarah Vaughan, Ne-Yo, and Mary J. Blige.

Recordings 

In 1962, James Brown, who had first played the Apollo three years earlier with his vocal group The Famous Flames, recorded his show at the theater. The resulting album, Live at the Apollo, was a groundbreaking success, spending 66 weeks on the Billboard pop albums chart and peaking at #2. Brown went on to record three more albums (Live at the Apollo, Volume II, Revolution of the Mind, Live at the Apollo 1995) and a television special, James Brown: Man to Man, at the theater, and helped popularize it as a venue for live recordings. Other performers who recorded albums at the Apollo include Patti LaBelle, Clyde McPhatter, Marva Whitney, The Mighty Clouds of Joy, and B.B. King.

In 1979 Bob Marley and The Wailers played four nights at the Apollo Theater from October 25 to 28 in support of their Survival Tour.

On April 24, 2002, American pop star Michael Jackson played a free concert, where he performed three songs (all of them were from his eighth studio album Dangerous). The concert raised about $3 million. It was Jackson's final on-stage performance before his death in 2009. There is no full footage from the concert. However, rehearsal of "Heal the World" leaked in late 2017.

In 2007, gospel recording artist Byron Cage played at the Apollo for his album Live at the Apollo: The Proclamation. In 2017, Bruno Mars recorded his first TV exclusive concert titled Bruno Mars: 24K Magic Live at the Apollo.

Guns N' Roses visited the venue on July 20, 2017, for their Not in This Lifetime... Tour, and they released "Live at the Apollo 2017"(3CDR+1DVDR).

Transportation
MTA Regional Bus Operations'  buses stop on 125th Street outside the theater. The  buses stop nearby, on Seventh Avenue, St. Nicholas Avenue, and Frederick Douglass Boulevard respectively.

See also
 African Americans in New York City
 List of New York City Designated Landmarks in Manhattan above 110th Street
 National Register of Historic Places listings in Manhattan above 110th Street

References

External links

 
 
 The Dick Davy Story, WFMU, 2007

1914 establishments in New York City
African-American arts organizations
African-American culture
African-American theatre
Black theatre
Burlesque theatres
Harlem
Historically African-American theaters and music venues
Music venues in Manhattan
Neoclassical architecture in New York City
New York City Designated Landmarks in Manhattan
New York City interior landmarks
Theatres completed in 1914
Theatres in Manhattan
Theatres on the National Register of Historic Places in Manhattan
Tourist attractions in Manhattan